Burtons Bridge is an unincorporated community and census-designated place in McHenry County, Illinois, United States. It was named a CDP for the 2020 census, at which time it had a population of 226.

Demographics

2020 census

References

Census-designated places in Illinois
Census-designated places in McHenry County, Illinois
Chicago metropolitan area